Mia Fey, known as  in the original Japanese language versions, is a fictional defense attorney in Ace Attorney, a visual novel  adventure video game series created by Japanese company Capcom. Mia is featured as the secondary support character and mentor to the protagonist Phoenix Wright in the first two games of the series, and as the secondary protagonist of the third game, which depicts the character's origin story. The character has also appeared in film, anime, and manga adaptations of the series, and crossover video games such as SNK vs. Capcom: Card Fighters DS and Teppen, and has received a universally positive critical reception, her strong-willed characterization throughout the series particularly noted.

Appearances
Mia first appears in Phoenix Wright: Ace Attorney, where she is introduced as rookie defense attorney Phoenix Wright's mentor and a member of the Fey clan, a family of spirit mediums living in the isolated mountain town of Kurain Village. After helping Phoenix win his first case, defending his friend Larry Butz, Mia is murdered by billionaire Redd White, and her younger sister Maya is framed and accused of sororicide. However, over the course of the trial, Maya uses her medium abilities to channel Mia's spirit, and Mia is able to guide Phoenix to prove Maya's innocence and White's guilt. In gratitude, Maya becomes Phoenix's legal assistant and partner, allowing him to consult Mia when he needs guidance. Following the conclusion of the game and Maya's temporary return to Kurain Village to take up Mia's intended mantle as Master of Kurain, Phoenix is hired to defend Mia's college friend Lana Skye by her sister Ema Skye.

In Phoenix Wright: Ace Attorney – Justice for All, Mia is channeled once again by her younger cousin Pearl Fey, allowing her to continue to guide Phoenix in becoming a defense attorney. After deducing that her aunt Morgan Fey planned to frame Maya for murder in order to claim the mantle of Master of Kurain for Pearl, Mia helps Phoenix prove Maya's innocence once again, finally physically reuniting with her and sharing a hug. Mia also guides Phoenix as to what it truly means to be an attorney after he realises one of his clients is guilty of the crime of which they were accused.

Mia returns in Phoenix Wright: Ace Attorney – Trials and Tribulations, which in addition to featuring her continuing to act as Phoenix's mentor through being channeled by Pearl, delves into Mia's own early years as a rookie defense attorney working for Marvin Grossberg, and how she became Phoenix's mentor. During a case defending death row inmate Terry Fawles for murder, with her coworker Diego Armando acting as her co-counsel and Miles Edgeworth acting as the prosecution, Mia realises that the witness to Terry's crime is the person Terry had been convicted of killing: Mia's cousin (and Pearl's half-sister) Dahlia Hawthorne; however, before Mia can prove Dahlia's guilt as the actual culprit of the current crime in court, Dahlia tricks Terry into committing suicide by poisoning him, forcing the trial to conclude. Sometime later, Diego confronts Dahlia about her past crimes, only for Dahlia to manage to poison Diego and leave him comatose. After Dahlia commits another murder for which she frames her boyfriend, art student Phoenix Wright, Mia successfully defends him and finally proves Dahlia's guilt, leading her to be sentenced to death. In the aftermath of the trial, impressed with Mia's abilities, Phoenix reveals that he has decided to switch his degree from art to law, and states that he hopes to see Mia in court again someday. He later becomes her apprentice. Several years later, Diego awakes from his coma to learn that Mia is dead, and that he himself is blind (forcing him to wear a special mask to see). Angered at Phoenix for failing to protect Mia in life, Diego becomes a prosecutor dubbed "Godot" to test his abilities as an "ace attorney". After Mia's mother Misty channels Dahlia's spirit to prevent Pearl from doing so, as part of another plot by Morgan to have Dahlia kill Maya for her. Diego, blinded revenge, kills Misty as he attempts to kill Dahlia. After admitting his guilt at the subsequent trial, Diego briefly sees Mia's spirit within Phoenix, and admits his proficiency as a lawyer.

Mia thanks Phoenix for saving Diego, declares that he has learned all that she can teach him, and bids him goodbye, saying that they may one day meet again. In the credits of the game, a sketch of Mia, Diego and Misty is seen.

Other appearances
Outside of the main Ace Attorney series, Mia also appears in several other Capcom games, including as an alternate costume for Phoenix in Ultimate Marvel vs. Capcom 3, and as a collectible card in SNK vs. Capcom: Card Fighters DS and Teppen: Ace vs. The People.

Mia has appeared in other media adaptations of Ace Attorney. She is a recurring character in the Ace Attorney manga series published by Kodansha Comics. Mia also appears in the Ace Attorney film, which loosely adapts her role from the first game, and the Ace Attorney anime series, which adapts the events of the original trilogy.

Concept and development
Ace Attorney series creator and director Shu Takumi created Mia as a mentor for Phoenix to contrast with her sister character of Maya Fey,. In the first draft of Phoenix Wright: Ace Attorney, Takumi created the second episode, "Turnabout Sisters", as the first episode of the game, featuring Mia Fey as the victim of the opening scene. However, the development team decided that it did not work well easing players into the game and as a result, Takumi wrote a shorter episode, "The First Turnabout", which was used as the game's first episode, providing with Mia with more characterisation and "heart", wanting players to care and focus on the thrill of "nailing the culprit".

When developing Phoenix Wright: Ace Attorney – Trials and Tribulations, Takumi came up with the idea of using a flashback to a case where Mia had just become an attorney; he later decided to develop this idea further, using flashbacks as a major theme for the game's story and featuring Mia as a playable character. Takumi additionally noted initially perceived problems in writing a case where Mia faces off against Edgeworth back when he was a rookie prosecutor, in that both characters had previously been established as never having lost a single case. Trying to come up with a way for a case in the past to work with neither of them winning or losing, he came up with the story for Terry Fawles, who dies during the trial. The game's main theme was "not everything is always what it seems on the surface".

Design
Along with the rest of the first game's characters, Mia Fey was designed and drawn by Kumiko Suekane and Tatsuro Iwamoto as a "glamorous, beautiful big sister type", with her death being used to explore Maya Fey's medium abilities. For situations when Mia's spirit is channeled by her sister Maya and cousin Pearl, she takes on her relative's hairstyles and clothing, which as is typical for traditional Japanese spirit mediums, includes a purple/pink kimono and a magatama bead, and an orange waitress uniform briefly in the third game.

Reception
Mia was received well by critics, especially for her strong-willed characterization throughout the series. Jay Castello at Eurogamer considered Mia "the biggest influence [for] how much [one] wanted to be a lawyer. In this, it wasn't Phoenix but his mentor Mia Fey that drove me. Compassionate, dedicated, and hyper-competent to the point of getting her own murderer to confess in court (it's a long story), she was everything that I wanted to be", with The Outer Haven praising their "passion" and status as "arguably one of the most important characters in the Ace Attorney series." Netzpiiloten Magazin described Mia as "one thing above all else: bizarre".

Kate Gray of Nintendo Life commented that "Mia's sudden and unexpected death is the very beginning of the series-long lesson that Ace Attorney is trying to teach its players: never take anything for granted", comparatively comparing their death and its impact to that of Sean Bean's Ned Stark at the conclusion of the first season of Game of Thrones. While criticizing Mia's death as falling into the trope of "fridging", Gray noted "return as Ghost Advisor [as] making her a little different", characterized as "an absolute boss" over the course of the Phoenix Wright: Ace Attorney Trilogy.

References

Ace Attorney characters
Animated human characters
Capcom protagonists
Female characters in animation
Female characters in anime and manga
Female characters in video games
Fictional American people in video games
Fictional characters from Los Angeles
Fictional defense attorneys
Fictional Japanese American people
Fictional private investigators
Fictional spiritual mediums
Video game characters introduced in 2001
Fictional female lawyers